HMS Uther (P62) was a Royal Navy U-class submarine built by Vickers-Armstrong.  So far she has been the only ship of the Royal Navy to bear the name Uther after the father of King Arthur, Uther Pendragon.

Career

Uther had a relatively quiet wartime career, serving on a number of uneventful patrols.  She continued in service for another five years and was eventually sold for scrapping in February 1950, and broken up at Hayle in April 1950.

References
 
 
 
 

 

British U-class submarines
Ships built on the River Tyne
1943 ships
World War II submarines of the United Kingdom
Ships built by Vickers Armstrong